St John the Evangelist's Church is a Church of England parish church located on the junction of Hills Road and Blinco Grove in Cambridge, Cambridgeshire. The previous vicar, Canon Susan Wyatt, previously of Over and Longstanton (Cambridgeshire), retired in June 2016 having come to the parish in 2006. The current priest-in-change (since June 2017) is the Revd James Shakespeare, who had served as curate at this church some years before.

History
The church was founded in 1891 as a daughter church of St Andrew's Church, Cherry Hinton, to serve the developing residential area between Hills Road and Cherry Hinton Road. At first services were held in the chapel of Homerton College. The work to raise funds for a building were undertaken by a committee whose members were drawn from the local community and the University of Cambridge, under the chair of the Master of Peterhouse. In 1893 a retired clergyman, the Reverend John George, offered to serve as curate-in-change on a voluntary basis. He played a significant role in the project to build the new church and he and his wife donated the pulpit to mark their silver wedding anniversary. The first stage of the church building was made usable by the end of 1897 and John George became the first vicar that year. He served until 1903.

The west end of the church was completed in 1929 during the priesthood of Reverend Patterson Morgan (1927–1938). The choir and clergy vestries were built in 1909. A parish room was built on the South side of the church in 1982 (Canon Frederick Wilkinson, 1975–1988), and extended to form the community rooms and new entrance area in 1995 (Canon Brian Jones, 1989–1997).

Notable people
Stephen Sykes, formerly Regius Professor of Divinity at the University of Cambridge and subsequently Bishop of Ely, served as curate at St John's from 1985 to 1990.

The Reverend Angela Tilby served as honorary priest from 1997–2006 until her appointment as vicar of St Benet's Church. She is well known for her work for BBC Radio Four, particularly as a regular contributor to Thought for the Day and the Morning Service.

Canon David Reindorp, a previous incumbent and now vicar of Chelsea Old Church, was the chaplain in the ITV series of reality television programmes Lads' Army and Bad Lads' Army''.

External links
Official website

John the Evangelist
History of Cambridge
Churches completed in 1897
19th-century Church of England church buildings